The Imaginary Direction of Time is the second full-length album by Norwegian progressive metal band Winds. It was released on July 26, 2004. Paul Stenning described the album in Terrorizer as lacking "any real sense of purpose. This seems like a 'concept' and 'avant garde' for the sake of it, turning the album into a mesh of clumsy comparisons and nothing of real worth...it's a none-too-daring experiment caught in the headlights of its own vision".

Track listing
 "What is Beauty?" – 5:03
 "Sounds Like Desolation" – 0:35
 "Theory of Relativity" – 4:47
 "Visions of Perfection" – 5:18
 "The Fireworks of Genesis" – 5:39
 "Under the Stars" – 6:25
 "A Moment For Reflection" – 5:57
 "Time Without End" – 4:09
 "The Final End" – 1:10
 "Beyond Fate" – 2:52
 "Silence in Despair" - 4:55
 "Infinity" - 3:17

Personnel

Line up
Eikind (Age of Silence, ex-Khold, Tulus) - Vocals, Bass
Carl August Tidemann - Guitars
Andy Winter (Age of Silence) - Piano, keyboards
Hellhammer (Age of Silence, Arcturus, ex-The Kovenant, Mayhem) - Drums

Session Members
Andre Orvik - Violin
Vegard Johnsen - Violin
Dorthe Dreier - Viola
Hans Josef Groh - Cello

References

Winds (band) albums
2004 albums
Albums with cover art by Travis Smith (artist)